The 2000 Sta. Lucia Realtors season was the eighth season of the franchise in the Philippine Basketball Association (PBA).

Draft picks

Transactions

Finals stint
Under new head coach Norman Black, who moved from Pop Cola to Sta.Lucia at the beginning of the season, the Realtors played in the PBA championship series for the first time in their eight-year history during the Commissioner's Cup, Sta.Lucia lost to defending champions San Miguel Beermen in five games.

Roster

Elimination round

Games won

(*) loss was reversed and change to a win

References

Sta. Lucia
Sta. Lucia Realtors seasons